Sweetnam is a surname. Notable people with the surname include:

 Darren Sweetnam (born 1993), Irish rugby union player 
 Nancy Sweetnam (born 1973), Canadian former competition swimmer 
 Rodney Sweetnam (1927–2013), British orthopaedic surgeon
 Skye Sweetnam (born 1988), Canadian singer-songwriter